Peter Tschernegg (born 23 July 1992) is an Austrian professional footballer who plays as a midfielder for SKU Amstetten.

Club career
In the summer of 2021 he moved to SKU Amstetten on a two-year deal.

References

External links
 
 Profile at club website 

1992 births
People from Deutschlandsberg District
Footballers from Styria
Living people
Austrian footballers
Association football midfielders
Austria youth international footballers
Austria under-21 international footballers
SV Grödig players
Wolfsberger AC players
FC St. Gallen players
TSV Hartberg players
Grazer AK players
SKU Amstetten players
Austrian Football Bundesliga players
Swiss Super League players
2. Liga (Austria) players
Austrian expatriate footballers
Expatriate footballers in Switzerland
Austrian expatriate sportspeople in Switzerland